Hostile Waters is a 1997 nonfiction book by Peter Huchthausen, Igor Kurdin and R. Alan White that describes the 1986 loss of the Soviet submarine K-219 off Bermuda while captained by Igor Britanov. 

The incident was also described in the 1997 film of the same name.

With a foreword by Tom Clancy, it begins with a note to the reader:
The ordeal of the K-219 took place at the very height of the cold war.
Much of its story is still shrouded in secrecy. Operations involving American submarines are simply not discussed by the United States Navy.

Ironically, it proved easier to obtain information from the Russians. Events portrayed in this book reflect that difference. Acts taken by, conversations held between, even the private thoughts of the crew of the K-219 are taken directly from their testimony or from the submarine's log.

Actions inside and maneuvers made by the American sub present at K-219 ordeal were reconstructed from Russian observations, American reports, interviews with many American naval officers and experts, and the author's long experience in naval affairs. Conversations and commands portrayed in the book may not be the actual words spoken, the commands sent, or the orders received.

Like any intelligence analysis, the authors had to reconstruct this story from multiple sources. Sometimes they disagreed on the details. Their substance, however, is true.

The paperback copy of the book featured black-and-white photos of the sub, the various men who served as the crew together with the authors.

There are 18 Chapters and an Appendix with the K-219 complement along with an extensive bibliography.

1997 non-fiction books